Agatha is an unincorporated area in southeastern Alberta, Canada.

Agatha has the name of Agatha, Lady Hindlip.

References 

Localities in Cypress County